Multiple EGF like domains 6 is a protein that in humans is encoded by the MEGF6 gene.

References

Further reading